The Hyderabad Sultans is the Indian Premier Hockey League team from Hyderabad of royal lineage, mixing tradition with modernity, they are the progressive nawabs.
The squad is captained by Sardara Singh since 2007–08 edition. They were winners of first Premier Hockey League in 2005.

History

Founding

The club was formed on the back grounds of inaugural Premier Hockey League in year 2005. It started off with many host of hockey superstars from India and Pakistan. Sultans, led by ever-dependable Dilip Tirkey, were crowned the champions of the inaugural PHL at home. At the sprawling Gachibowli sports complex, Sultans came out as a surprise packet. Dilip Tirkey was at his best along with penalty corner specialist Sohail Abbas and Waseem Ahmad who helped the team score crucial wins with their combined moves in the first year. Sohail Abbas, along with Len Aiyappa of Hi-Fliers, became the joint top-scorers of the league.

Loss of form and players exodus (2006–2007)
In the second year too,  Hyderabad Sultans played well and were in contention for the final berth even playing without star performers of 2005, Waseem Ahmad who left the team in 2006 but were edged out by Bangalore Lions on goal average. They won five out of the eight matches and had 13 points, just one less than the table toppers Chandigarh Dynamos and so Hyderabad Sultans finished third in league. In the third year,  Hyderabad Sultans failed miserably winning just one match in the new format. They also lost their skipper Dilip Tirkey and many experienced players who joined Orissa Steelers as they were promoted to the Premier Division. Sultans ended at the bottom of table that season avoiding relegation as second division was scrapped.

Current (2008–present)
In the season of 2008 young Sardara Singh led the team. Saradara Singh along with his brother Didar Singh were the only experienced stars in the team but it had talented youngsters in Bikas Toppo and Pawal Lakra, who were capable of making inroads into any defence. They also depended on how K.M.Chengappa and Nitin Kumar help their forwards Didar Singh and Sardara Singh. The team had an emerging drag-flicker in Diwakar Ram, who carried the team's burden during the short corners. The player to watch out were upcoming Promod Kumar, who was the fulcrum of the team.
Adnan Maqsood and Kamran Ahmed were the foreign players along with Dutch goalkeeper Oscar Ter Weeme.
The team also had a new coach in Madhukaran who was assisted by Alphonse Lazarus and they finished their campiange by finishing fourth in league, qualifying for play-off where they lost to Chandigarh Dynamos.

Gachibowli Hockey Stadium
Gachibowli Hockey Stadium is a field hockey stadium at Hyderabad, Andhra Pradesh, India. It is the home of the Hyderabad Sultans of the Premier Hockey League.  It has a seating capacity of 8,000 people.

Hyderabad Sultans season by season performance

Players

First-Team squad
As of PHL 4 – 2008.

Note: List of player is obtained from PHL website. The list might change in the near future.

Other important team personnel

  Madhukaran (Chief Coach)
  Alphonse Lazarus (Asst Coach)
  CR Bheem Singh (Physical Trainer)
  P.Kanthaiah (Manager)

Former players

Goal keepers

Club captains

International players

Club officials

Coaching and medical staff

 Manager:           P.Kanthaiah      
 Chief Coach:       Madhukaran       
 Asst Coach:        Alphonse Lazarus 
 Physical Trainer:  CR Bheem Singh

Chief Coach history

Honours

 Premier Hockey League Titles: 1
 2005

See also

 Premier Hockey League
 Larkana Bulls

References

Indian field hockey clubs
Premier Hockey League teams
Sports clubs in India
Sport in Telangana
2005 establishments in Andhra Pradesh